was a member of the Social Democratic Party from Okinawa, who served in the House of Representatives from 2003 to 2021. Teruya was part of the All-Okinawa coalition, which opposed the relocation of a US Marine base to Nago.

Teruya was previously a member of the House of Councillors between 1995 and 2001.

References

External links 
Official website

1945 births
2022 deaths
Deaths from stomach cancer
People from Saipan
People from Okinawa Prefecture
Social Democratic Party (Japan) politicians
Members of the House of Representatives from Okinawa Prefecture
Members of the House of Representatives (Japan)
Members of the House of Councillors (Japan)
Members of the Okinawa Prefectural Assembly
Ryukyu independence activists